was a Japanese historian, educator, and author active during the early 20th century.

Biography 
Ishihara was born in the vicinity of Kumamoto city shortly after the Meiji Restoration. In 1876, when Ishihara was three years old, his father participated in the Keishintō's assault on Kumamoto Castle. Although he survived the first engagement, Unshirō chose to commit seppuku alongside a friend after the uprising's defeat by forces under Kodama Gentarō. The young Ishihara was present when military police later arrived to search the family house, and he was thereafter raised by his mother and grandmother.

Ishihara was distraught that the Keishintō would be forgotten while still branded insurgents, and devoted his life to gathering historical materials and testimony from surviving relatives of the men involved and investigating the truth of the uprising. In 1935, the results of his studies were published in monograph form under the name .

Near the end of his life, Ishihara exchanged letters with Tokutomi Sohō on several occasions. He died in 1936.

Legacy 

Ishihara's work was expounded upon by Hasuda Zenmei, one of the last kokugaku students and an early influence on the author Yukio Mishima. Later in the 20th century, material from the Sakurayama archive was examined by the author and historian Araki Seishi. During the late 1960s, Araki collaborated with Yukio Mishima in the latter's preliminary research for the historical fiction novel Runaway Horses, which contains a depiction of the Shinpūren rebellion very closely modeled on Ishihara's text.

Bibliography

References 

1874 births
1936 deaths
19th-century_Japanese_historians
20th-century Japanese historians
Japanese Shintoists
Writers from Kumamoto Prefecture
People from Kumamoto Prefecture